The Women's World Chess Championship 2001 took place from November 25 to December 14, 2001, in Moscow, Russia.  It was won by Zhu Chen, who beat Alexandra Kosteniuk in the final by 5 to 3. The final was tied 2–2 after the classical games and decided in the rapid tie-breaks.

For the second time, the championship took the form of a 64-player knock-out tournament.

Participants
The qualified players were seeded by their Elo ratings (October 2001).

Notable top players not taking part were Judit Polgár (ranked the no. 1 woman in the world), Xie Jun (ranked 2nd), Wang Lei (4th), Pia Cramling (6th), Koneru Humpy (13th), Qin Kanying (15th), Sofia Polgar (16th), and Viktorija Čmilytė (20th).

Polgár, ranked 1st female and 19th overall in the world, chose instead to participate in the concurrent open event. Reigning champion Xie Jun had put her active career on hold at the time and decided not to defend her title.

Qualification paths

WC: semifinalists of Women's World Chess Championship 2000 (2)
J: World Junior Champion 2000
R: Rating (7)
E: European Individual Chess Championship (29)
AM: American Continental Chess Championship 2001

AS: Asian Chess Championship (6)
AF: African Chess Championship 2001 (3)
Z2.1 (3), Z2.2, Z2.3, Z2.4, Z2.5, Z3.1a, Z3.1b, Z3.2a, Z3.2b, Z3.3, Z3.4: Zonal tournaments
PN: FIDE President nominee (2)

Results

Final Match 
{| class="wikitable" style="text-align:center"
|+Women's World Chess Championship Final 2001
|-
! rowspan=2| !! colspan=4|Classical games !! colspan=4|Rapid tie-breaks !! rowspan=2|  Total
|-
! 1 !! 2 !! 3 !! 4 !! 5 !! 6 !! 7 !! 8 
|-
| align=left | 
| style="background:black; color:white"| 0 || 1 ||style="background:black; color:white"| 1 || 0 || 1 ||style="background:black; color:white"| 0 || 1 ||style="background:black; color:white"| 1 || 5
|-
| align=left | 
| 1 ||style="background:black; color:white"| 0 || 0 ||style="background:black; color:white"| 1 ||style="background:black; color:white"| 0 || 1 ||style="background:black; color:white"| 0 || 0 || 3
|}

Bracket

References

External links

2001 in chess
Women's World Chess Championships
Chess Championship
Chess in Russia
2001 in Russia
2001 in Moscow